The Hillman Wizard 75, Hillman Twenty 70, Hillman Hawk and their long wheelbase variants Hillman Seven Seater and  Hillman 80 models were a series of 20 horsepower (RAC rating) medium priced 5-7 seater executive cars made by Hillman during the 1930s.

Built at a time when body and chassis were quite separate structures Hillman's 20 horsepower chassis was given three different body shapes in five years and a grand total of five different names if the long wheelbase cars are included. The same body shapes and chassis were used for Hillman's 16 horsepower offering though that smaller engine was not offered with their long wheelbase cars.

Towards the end of the 1930s the badges of the current models were changed by the Rootes brothers to Humber Snipe.

Hillman Wizard 75

1931 a completely new Hillman
"The Hillman Wizard, The car for the roads of the world" was designed by the Rootes brothers to capture new export markets and to continue their Super Snipe's challenge to "the American type of car". They were freshly in control of Humber as well as Hillman and Britain exported comparatively few cars.

The chassis frame has five cross members and the frame is deep and as rigid as possible. The front axle has an H section with rectangular ends for torsional stress. Duo-Servo 4-wheel brakes are Bendix design operating, after two primary rods, by enclosed cables on  drums. The springing is half-elliptical on both axles and they are controlled by double-acting hydraulic shock absorbers. Steering is by a worm and nut design. The cars are supplied with artillery wheels and a fixed roof, wire wheels and a sunshine roof are optional extras.

Headlamps are dip-and-switch.

A road test of the family saloon by The Times motoring correspondent published at the end of June 1931 noted that the seating for five passengers is comfortable and there is a wide view right round. The forward side windows can be wound right down but the large rear windows only as much as a third of the way. The opening windscreen is safety glass with one electric wiper and a reflecting mirror is provided. There are no ashtrays and there were slight squeaks in the body. A stoplight is fitted and a luggage grid. A spare artillery wheel and tyre are fitted in a well on the front wing. The brakes were very effective except when backing the car. Steering — light and steady.

A de luxe model was announced on 1 January 1932. Among its improvements were: new colour schemes, a luggage trunk on the grid at the rear, walnut dashboard and window fillets, special furniture hide, de luxe carpets and head-lining with a parcel net, indirect lighting for the instrument panel, larger thinner-rimmed steering wheel, double-barred bumpers, and three ashtrays.

In March 1933 Hillman announced that the Wizard had been given Cyclonic Induction providing "a power surge". This appears to have been a switch from an unspecified design of carburettor to a downdraught design.

Just two months later in mid-September Hillman announced the Wizard's replacement, their new model Hillman 20/70, with new all-steel bodies and electric direction indicators.<ref name=TT46550>Cars Of 1934, New Hillman Models. The Times, Friday, Sep 15, 1933; pg. 7; Issue 46550</ref>

Hillman Twenty 70

1934 a revised body
The Wizard did not sell as well as planned and the cost of Pressed Steel's tooling has been spread across to this new model. The Twenty 70 body remains essentially the Wizard's but with new grilles, wings and rear valance.

The Twenty 70 announced in mid-September 1933 remains all-steel and now more streamlined. It has been given an outswept long-skirted tail in place of the former D-shape. There are separate chairs in front  except on the Family saloon which has a three-seater single-piece bench seat at the front. Triplex safety glass is now throughout the car. There are dual screenwipers, a roof lamp, a rear blind which may be controlled from the driver's seat, locks on all doors and a driving mirror. A special design of bumpers is standard throughout the range. De luxe saloons have a sunshine roof, ash trays, cigar lighter, a parcel net on the ceiling and pillar pulls. A luggage grid was also fitted at the back of de luxe saloons.

The radiator grille or shell stylishly slopes back to match the new streamlined coachwork and its chromium-plated shutters are thermostatically controlled.

Electric direction indicators are fitted. Built into the body sides they are invisible unless in operation. They are controlled from the steering wheel and they are self-cancelling.

Every saloon has a wireless aerial installed in the saloon's roof. A Philco Transitone wireless set is available as an option. Hillman's small car range now included their Melody Minx.

As before as well as the saloons described above a sports saloon, a foursome drophead coupé and a five-seater (open) tourer are available Again the Seven Seater has a longer wheelbase and may be purchased as a saloon, limousine or landaulette. All three have a pair of occasional seats in the rear compartment, the limousine is an ideal mourning carriage.

While the new car's chassis is little changed from the Wizard the engine now provides Cushioned Power endowed by its new flexible mountings. The engine clutch and gearbox unit is suspended at three points on rubber. The four speed gearbox now has synchromesh between third and top and freewheel except on the cheapest "Family" model. All gears are "silent". The freewheel can be locked by a control on the facia. Startix optional engine starting is now fitted.The Times tried driving the Seven Seater limousine, a long wheelbase version of the Twenty 70. It is mechanically identical except for the back axle which uses the lower ratio of the smaller engined sixteen. Driving was comfortable and all the controls functioned well, the steering was particularly good. The car was perfectly capable of  but the rear springs were too firm without a load in the car and some variable control should be provided. The car  "is a remarkable job for the money".

1935
1935 models were distinguished by a radiator shell or grille painted in the body colour, the radiator filler cap moved under the bonnet and a chromium plated motif above the bonnet. A thermostatically controlled cut-out now allows the engine to fully warm before letting water circulate to the radiator.The Times tried a 1935 model sports saloon. It described the engine as a good performer and one of the car's chief attractions. The car accomplished a good . The brakes need light pedal pressure. They tended to grab and affect the steering but this might have been on just this particular car. The synchromesh works well. "The outstanding characteristic in the appearance of this car is compactness". This sports saloon weighed 29½ cwt .

The Twenty 70 and 16 cars did not sell well in spite of the best efforts of William Rootes and his sales team. "The public still looked upon them as updated Wizards".

Hillman Hawk

1936 a new body and bigger 20 horsepower engine
A new streamlined body was announced in October 1935 with a new name for the 20, Hawk.  Chassis design was by William Haynes assisted by Alec Issigonis. The modern all-steel semi-monocoque style body was designed by Thrupp & Maberly, London coachbuilders also owned by Rootes Group. The new body houses the spare wheel in the tail. Its new lines "are planned to flow smoothly from the radiator". . . "to the trunk at the rear with the streamlined well-valanced wings merging harmoniously into the whole". As before the sloping single-piece windscreen may be opened to give better vision in fog.

The new model's Superpower engine is enlarged 13 per cent achieved by lengthening its stroke by 14 mm. Although the cubic capacity rose from 2810 cc to 3181 cc this did not affect the car's tax rating because the RAC formula takes no account of an engine's stroke. The only other changes from the engine of the Twenty 70 were the introduction of replaceable hardened steel valve seats and improved steel-backed main bearings for the crankshaft. The instrument panel now has a rheostat switch to vary the lighting at will.

1937
There is no change to the cars but there are significant price reductions all round and a new Safety saloon with Triplex safety glass all round is listed in place of last season's Family saloon. The cars are heavily advertised with the statements "Tested approved and ordered by His Majesty's War Office, the Royal Air Force, the Metropolitan and Provincial Police and other great public services at home and overseas."The Times'' tried the 80 enclosed limousine from the driving seat and reported the engine is well balanced, smooth in operation because of its rubber mounts and lively, "quiet as well as silky".  can be reached on top gear.

1938 a new Humber Snipe
October 1937 Earls Court Motorshow. The old Hawk, now the Humber Snipe —and the old Hillman Sixteen now a Humber Sixteen— is displayed without further comment on Humber's stand

Production
About 700 Hillman "16"s were built between 1936-37 whereas around 5000 Hillman "Hawk"s were built during the same period and an estimated 300 Hillman "80"s were constructed between 1936-38. These models were produced as standard saloons and deluxe saloons, some of which were used by the military, police and government departments, with a small number of each model being produced as sports tourers, cabriolets and coupes, the bodywork being converted by  coachbuilders Thrupp & Maberly and Wingham (Martin Walter).

Survivors
Only a few examples of each model still exist in the UK today. Some of these vehicles were exported throughout the world, especially to Australia and New Zealand where a number of "Hawk"s and "80"'s also still survive.

References

Notes

External links 
 Hillman Hawk
 Hillman Hawk rear view
  1936 Hillman 80
Hillman Sixteen/Hawk/80 website
Hillman Wizard website

Twenty